Roberto Luis Irañeta :es:Roberto Irañeta (March 21, 1915 – November 30, 1993) was an Argentinian football forward who played for Argentina in the 1934 FIFA World Cup. He also played for Gimnasia y Esgrima de Mendoza.

Fifa World Cup Career

References

External links

Biography of the Roberto Irañeta 

1915 births
1993 deaths
Argentine footballers
Argentine people of Spanish descent
Argentina international footballers
Association football defenders
1934 FIFA World Cup players